The 24 Hours of Le Mans is an annual 24-hour automobile endurance race organised by the automotive group Automobile Club de l'Ouest (ACO) and held on the Circuit de la Sarthe race track close to the city of Le Mans, the capital of the French department of Sarthe. From the first event in 1923, the ACO advocated sexual equality by permitting women to participate at Le Mans, ranking them equally with men under its performance standards. From 1957, the ACO refused to allow women to enter the event after the fatal accident of Annie Bousquet at the 1956 12 Hours of Reims, as well as spectator deaths in the 1955 Le Mans disaster and the 1957 Mille Miglia.

 there have been 65 female drivers representing 15 countries who have started the race a total of 150 times and have finished on 82 occasions. Anne-Charlotte Verney of France holds the record for the most starts in the race with ten. Belgian Vanina Ickx is second with seven starts and Marie-Claude Beaumont of France is third with six starts. France is the most represented country, having produced 22 female participants, followed by the United Kingdom with 16 female drivers and Belgium with five female racers. The most recent woman to make her Le Mans debut was Lilou Wadoux in 2022.

Since the first race in 1923, there have been 29 all-female squads, consisting of either two or three drivers. There have been two all-female teams who have won their class. The first all-female crew to win their category was the "Christine" – Ecurie Seiko team of Christine Beckers, Yvette Fontaine and Marie Laurent in the 1974 edition and the second was the Société Esso trio of Christine Dacremont, Marianne Hoepfner and Michèle Mouton in the 1975 race. The race to feature the highest number of all-female squads was the 1935 event featuring four teams. The highest overall finish by an individual woman at Le Mans was achieved by Siko, who came fourth in the 1932 edition. The best performing all-female team was the seventh-placed Mme Mareuse duo of Maruese and Siko in the 1930 edition.

Drivers

By name

By country

All-women teams

See also
 List of female Formula One drivers
 List of female Indianapolis 500 drivers
 List of female NASCAR drivers
 List of female racing drivers

Notes

References

Bibliography

External links
 

Female
24 Hours Le Mans drivers
24 Hours of Le Mans drivers
Le Mans